Kalchini Assembly constituency is an assembly constituency in Alipurduar district in the Indian state of West Bengal. It is reserved for scheduled tribes.

Overview
As per orders of the Delimitation Commission, No. 11  Kalchini Assembly constituency (ST) covers Kalchini community development block and Majherdabri gram panchayat of  Alipurduar II community development block.

Kalchini Assembly constituency is part of No. 2  Alipurduars (Lok Sabha constituency) (ST).

Members of Legislative Assembly

Election results

2021

In the 2021 West Bengal Legislative Assembly election, Bishal Lama of BJP defeated his nearest rival Passang Lama of TMC.

2016

In the 2016 West Bengal Legislative Assembly election, Wilson Chapramary of TMC defeated his nearest rival Bishal Lama of BJP.

2011

In the 2011 West Bengal Legislative Assembly election, Wilson Chapramary (GJM supported Independent) defeated his nearest rival Binay Bhushan Kerketta of RSP.

2009 by election
Contests in most years were multi cornered but only winners and runners are being mentioned. In the 2009 by elections caused by the election of the sitting MLA Manohar Tirkey of RSP to the Lok Sabha from Alipurduars (Lok Sabha constituency), Wilson Champamari, Independent candidate supported by the Gorkha Janmukti Morcha defeated his nearest rival Sandip Ekka of Adivasi Vikas Parishad.

1977-2006
In the 2006 state assembly elections, Manohar Tirkey of RSP defeated Paban Kumar Lakra of Congress. Paban Kumar Lakra of Congress defeated Manohar Tirkey of RSP in 2001. Manohar Tirkey of RSP defeated Khudiram Pahan of Congress in 1996 and Khudiram Orao of Congress in 1991. Khudiram Pahan of Congress defeated Manohar Tirkey of RSP in 1987. Manohar Tirkey of RSP defeated Khudiram Pahan of Congress in 1982, and Denish Lakra of Congress in 1977.

1957-1972
Denis Lakra of Congress won in 1972, 1971, 1969, 1967. Nani Bhatacharya of RSP won in 1962 when it was an open seat. Debendra Nath Brahma Mandal and Anima Hoare, both of Congress, won in 1957 when it was a joint seat reserved for ST.

References

Assembly constituencies of West Bengal
Politics of Alipurduar district